Wells is an impact crater in the Eridania quadrangle on Mars. The crater was named after English writer H. G. Wells (1866–1946). The name was approved in 1973, by the International Astronomical Union (IAU) Working Group for Planetary System Nomenclature.  Wells is the author of the science-fiction novel The War of the Worlds, depicting an invasion of earth by Martians.

Wells lies west of Planum Chronium, and it penetrates the cratered uplands to the southeast of the Hellas basin.

See also 
 Dust devil tracks
 Geology of Mars
 Impact event
 List of craters on Mars
 Ore resources on Mars
 Planetary nomenclature

References 

Impact craters on Mars
Eridania quadrangle
Crater